"Let's Get It Started" is a song recorded by American group the Black Eyed Peas. It is a clean version of "Let's Get Retarded" from their third studio album, Elephunk (2003). The album version was originally only reworked for its use in promotion for the 2004 NBA Playoffs on ABC in April 2004; however, the new version was so well-received that it was released as the fourth and final single from Elephunk on June 1, 2004, by A&M Records and Interscope Records, also appearing on a reissue of the album.

"Let's Get It Started" peaked at number 21 on the US Billboard Hot 100, reaching the top ten in Australia, Canada, Czech Republic, France and New Zealand. Critically acclaimed, it won Best Rap Performance by a Duo or Group at the 47th Annual Grammy Awards (2005), and was also nominated for Record of the Year and Best Rap Song. The song's accompanying music video features the group energetically performing in a nighttime Los Angeles setting.

"Let's Get It Started" was remixed for the Black Eyed Peas' fifth studio album The E.N.D. (2009) as "Let's Get Re-Started", being included on its deluxe edition bonus disc. It was also featured on their remix album The E.N.D. Summer 2010 Canadian Invasion Tour: Remix Collection (2010). In early 2022, "Let's Get Retarded" was replaced with "Let's Get It Started" on the track listing of Elephunk on all digital and streaming platforms, thus becoming unavailable.

Music video
The music video takes place in a nighttime setting on a Los Angeles street. It features the Black Eyed Peas, particularly will.i.am, performing energetic dances while singing the song, while varying objects in the background (including a grand piano) smash against the ground in real-time, slow and fast motion, and in reverse. The choruses feature the band on stage singing to a large crowd.

Track listings

 Canadian and European CD single, Australian CD 1
UK 12-inch single
 "Let's Get It Started" – 3:37
 "The Way U Make Me Feel" – 4:19
 "Let's Get Retarded" – 3:38

 UK CD single
 "Let's Get It Started" – 3:37
 "Let's Get Retarded" – 3:38
 "Bridging the Gaps" – 4:56
 "Let's Get It Started" (video)

 German mini-CD single
 "Let's Get It Started"
 "The Way U Make Me Feel"

 Australian CD2
 "Let's Get It Started"
 "The Way U Make Me Feel"
 "Bridging the Gaps"
 "Let's Get Retarded"

Personnel

The Black Eyed Peas
 will.i.am – vocals, production, engineering
 apl.de.ap – vocals
 Taboo – vocals
 Fergie – vocals

Additional musicians
 George Pajon, Jr. – guitar
 Mike Fratantuno – bass
 Terence Yoshiaki – drums
 Dante Santiago – backing vocals
 Noelle Scaggs – backing vocals (single version)
 Keith Harris – additional drums (single version)
 Tim "Izo" Orindgreff – saxophone, flute (single version)
 Printz Board – trumpet (single version)

Production personnel
 Ron Fair – executive production
 Dylan Dresdow – additional vocal engineering
 Tony Maserati – mixing
 Brian Gardner – mastering
 Lee Groves – programming (single version)
 Mark "Spike" Stent – mixing (single version)
 Robert Haggett – assistant mixing (single version)
 David Treahearn – assistant mixing (single version)

Charts

Weekly charts

Year-end charts

Certifications

Release history

References

2003 songs
2004 singles
A&M Records singles
ABC Sports
Black Eyed Peas songs
Interscope Records singles
Music videos directed by Francis Lawrence
Obscenity controversies in music
Songs written by apl.de.ap
Songs written by George Pajon
Songs written by Taboo (rapper)
Songs written by will.i.am